Humeral spines are ventrolateral extensions of the humeral crista ventralis. These structures are present in the humerus of some frogs (anurans). The majority of anuran species that present humeral spines are glassfrogs (family Centrolenidae) but humeral spines have been reported in various other species of different families of frogs, including Ceratophryidae and Hylidae. 

In all cases, humeral spines are present in males but not in females.

See also
Nuptial pad

References

Amphibian anatomy